Dishon is a settlement in northern Israel.

Dishon may also refer to:

Dishon Stream (Nahal Dishon) a stream by the settlement
Dishon (ḏîšōn),  a Hebrew biblical name for pygarg, possibly an antelope species
 ( מערת דישון), Northern District, Israel
, a hill in Northern Israel
Dishon, an unclear biblical character
Colleen Dishon (1924-2004), American journalist
Jessica Dishon, a missing person discussed in episode 134 (2017) Cold Case Files reality legal show/documentary

See also